Dyscravia is a voicing substitution dysgraphia, i.e. a type of writing disorder in which the affected person confuses letters denoting sounds that differ in their voicing attribute (e.g. writing "dap" instead of "tap" or "tash" instead of "dash"). It arises from a deficit within the phoneme-to-grapheme conversion process in a cognitive function specialized in the conversion of the voicing feature of phonemes into graphemes – a distinct function within the phoneme-to-grapheme conversion route. This deficit does not result from impairments in auditory processing or in speech production. It can occur with completely intact graphemic buffer, phonological output lexicon, phonological output buffer, and allographic stage – the function that processes the voicing feature for writing may be selectively impaired without deficits in other functions of the conversion route. Dyscravia may or may not be accompanied by a parallel reading disability (i.e. a dyslexia in which letters denoting voiceless consonants are pronounced as voiced and vice versa).

References

Dysgraphia
Language disorders
Aphasias
Psycholinguistics
Neurolinguistics
Dyscravia
Phonology
Spelling
Learning disabilities
D
Symptoms and signs: Speech and voice
Applied linguistics
Dyslexia